Golden Sands (Bulgarian: Златни пясъци, Zlatni pyasatsi ) is a major seaside resort town on the northern Bulgarian Black Sea Coast, adjacent to a national park of the same name in the municipality of Varna.

Located 17 km north of downtown Varna, it is virtually connected to the city by a continuous swath of resorts and villa communities. It is a popular tourist destination, drawing many visitors from Romania, Ukraine, Poland, Germany, the United Kingdom, Russia, Scandinavia, France, Central and Eastern Europe, the Persian Gulf and other countries.

Transportation
Golden Sands is served by several regular bus lines of the Varna public transit system. Buses 9, 89 and 109 connect the resort to Varna Railway Station, bus 409 connects to Varna International Airport via the city centre and buses 209 and 309 connect to other areas of Varna.

Development 

The old-growth forests between ancient Odessos and Dionysopolis were first mentioned by Pliny as the home of mythical dwarfs, visited by the Argonauts. Byzantine sources name the local fortress Gerania; there are 4th-7th century AD remains of massive stone ramparts and a basilica along the edge of the Franga plateau. The cave Aladzha Monastery, 3 km to the west, was a monastic centre from antiquity through the Second Bulgarian Empire. In the days of the Ottoman Empire, Uzunkum was known as a hideaway for outlaws. It was largely uninhabited until the 1950s, although used for outings.

Resort development started in 1957 and in about two decades, the place was transformed into a modern holiday complex with numerous hotels (many open year-round), villas, apartment buildings, spa centres, restaurants, clubs, casinos, attractions, shopping centres, and sports facilities, including a yacht marina, a horse riding school, and the Aquapolis water park. Golden Sands was privatized in the 1990s and attracted considerable investment through the 2000s. Designed initially for 13,000 hotel beds, it had over 30,000 beds reported in 2007; according to Varna Tourist Chamber sources, the actual number was significantly higher, by some unverified critical estimates even approaching 90,000. Currently, most hotels offer all-inclusive vacations, but there are also concerted efforts to reposition the resort as a high-end destination.

The area is labelled to have the purest quartz sand on the coast and abounds in old trees, landscaped gardens, and pedestrian malls. Golden Sands authorities resist demands to provide more automobile roads and car parks, citing the resort's reputation as family friendly, green, and a largely pedestrian place.

Hot mineral water springs and lush woodlands cascading from the Franga Plateau, forming the Golden Sands Nature Park, turn the town into one of the most popular tourist spots in Eastern Europe. It also comprises the Holiday Club Riviera luxury resort, several villa communities including Panorama, Chaika, Kabakum, and Alen Mak, and the historic grotto of Aladzha Monastery in the vicinity. A contemporary chapel of John the Baptist was recently added. Just north is perhaps the best known gay beach in the nation. Three 18-hole golf courses designed by Gary Player and Ian Woosnam are currently (2007) being developed around Balchik and Kavarna a short drive to the north.

Golden Sands urban development took place within a protected area declared in 1943 (its original name was Hachuka State Forest); some nature landmarks were lost in the process, such as beach freshwater ponds abounding in tortoises and snakes and beach nesting bird habitats. But the bulk of the nature park was preserved and its area expanded almost twice to over 1,300 hectares. In the 2000s, although Golden Sands managed to a large extent to avoid being overdeveloped as other large resorts were, parts of the protected forest adjacent to the urban area were cleared for the construction of the Aquapolis water park.

In 2007, a larger-capacity water purification plant was also badly needed. The scenic route Varna-Golden Sands, ruptured by a small landslide caused by overdevelopment in the Lipov Kladenets villa district in 2004, remained closed and all traffic redirected to inland roads. In 2007, all roads proved inadequate to handle an unexpected surge of Romanian motorists looking for all-inclusive deals during the Easter and May Day vacations, causing massive traffic jams and accidents.

Buildings and structures
In 2007, a 1:10 replica of the Eiffel Tower with an observation deck and a restaurant was erected.

The tallest building is INTERNATIONAL Hotel Casino & Tower Suites

References

External links

 Official website

 
Seaside resorts in Bulgaria
Populated places in Varna Province